Palpebral arteries may refer to:

 Lateral palpebral arteries
 Medial palpebral arteries